Cyclomilta is a genus of moths in the subfamily Arctiinae. The genus was erected by George Hampson in 1900.

Species
Cyclomilta cambodiaca Dubatolov & Bucsek, 2013 Cambodia
Cyclomilta fangchenglaiae Dubatolov, Kishida & Wang, 2012 Guangdong province of China
Cyclomilta melanolepia (Dudgeon, 1900) Sikkim state of India
Cyclomilta ravus Bucsek, 2012 Malaysia

References

Lithosiini
Moth genera